The men's team archery competition at the 2012 Olympic Games in London was held from 27–28 July at Lord's Cricket Ground.

Italy won the gold medal with Michele Frangilli, Marco Galiazzo and Mauro Nespoli. The United States won silver and South Korea won bronze.

Competition format
The teams were ranked 1st to 12th based on the three team members' ranking round results and this was used to seed them into a head-to-head knockout bracket. Each member of the team shot eight arrows in a match (for a total of 24 arrows per team) and the team with the highest total won the match. The winner advanced to the next round while the loser was eliminated from the competition.

Schedule

All times are British Summer Time (UTC+1).

Records

Prior to this competition, the existing world and Olympic records were as follows.  The ranking round records were broken during the 2012 competition by the South Korean team.

216 arrow ranking round

24 arrow match

Results

Ranking round

Competition bracket

References

Archery at the 2012 Summer Olympics
Men's events at the 2012 Summer Olympics